Louie Philippe Vicente Vigil (born September 26, 1991) is a Filipino professional basketball player for the NorthPort Batang Pier of the Philippine Basketball Association (PBA).

PBA career statistics

As of the end of 2022–23 season

Season-by-season averages

|-
| align=left | 
| align=left | San Miguel
| 18 || 2.4 || .294 || .000 || .714 || .3 || .4 || .0 || .1 || .8
|-
| align=left | 
| align=left | San Miguel
| 9 || 3.2 || .154 || .000 || .273 || 1.0 || .2 || .2 || .1 || .8
|-
| align=left | 
| align=left | NorthPort
| 10 || 5.4 || .263 || .000 || .750 || 1.2 || .5 || .3 || .2 || 1.6
|-class=sortbottom
| align="center" colspan=2 | Career
| 37 || 3.4 || .245 || .000 || .538 || .7|| .4 || .1 || .1 || 1.0

References

1991 births
Living people
Filipino men's basketball players
José Rizal University alumni
San Miguel Beermen players
Shooting guards
Small forwards
UST Growling Tigers basketball players
San Miguel Beermen draft picks
Filipino men's 3x3 basketball players
PBA 3x3 players
NorthPort Batang Pier players